The Atascadero News is a weekly printed newspaper and daily online publication based in Atascadero, San Luis Obispo County, California. It serves the residents of northern San Luis Obispo County.

The newspaper is operated by its 13 Stars Media, with a readership primarily in Atascadero and surrounding communities, including Templeton, Creston and Santa Margarita.

History

Edward Gardner Lewis founded Atascadero as a planned, utopian community in 1913. As a magazine publisher, he built the Atascadero Printery and began publishing The Atascadero News as a newspaper, as well as the Illustrated Review magazine.

E.G. Lewis era 

Within three years of its founding in 1913, the Volume 1, Number 1 issue of The Atascadero News made its debut on January 22, 1916. The subscription price was two cents per copy, or 50 cents for the whole year. The paper was only four pages for the first two editions and then jumped to eight. When the paper first rolled off the press it would be two years before the Colony Administration Building would be occupied. Atascadero Grammar School was under construction, as was the Mercantile Building. There were still tents over on the hill below Pine Mountain although many houses were being constructed throughout the town.

The paper was originally owned by the Colony Holding Corporation. The publisher was Edward Gardner Lewis. Lewis had publishing experience in the east and at one time had the largest printing press in the world in his University City, Missouri plant. The first editor for the News was L.D. Beckwith. From the very beginning, the Atascadero News concentrated on local news and events and as a way for Mr. Lewis to tell readers what was happening in his Colony.

The paper, published weekly, covered births, deaths, weddings, parties and in-depth reporting on all things social. The newspaper also carried national and world news with leased wire service lines from International News Service and the Pacific News Service.

The Atascadero News is one of the three oldest continuing businesses in the Atascadero.

The first front page picture carried in the newspaper was of the City Administration Building although it was still two years away from being occupied.

The paper reported on the first meeting of the local chapter of the Eastern Star. The first Worthy Matron was Rhonda Hunter. The paper ran photos of every new home built in the Colony over the first five or six years. The paper was mailed to Lewis supporters throughout the United States.

All through its existence Atascadero News has been a conservative newspaper. Another editor, J.N. Bissell, wrote an editorial against the new state auto license fee and called it “an unfair tax upon automobile owners.” And when the issue of “wet” or “dry” came up regarding alcohol, the newspaper argued that “the saloon has to go.” The paper did caution that if you take alcohol away from the populace, you have to replace it with something or else people “will turn to unsafe substitutes.”

The newspaper was independently owned by seven different publishers over the next eight decades until it was sold to News Media, Inc., based in Illinois, in 2002.

For the first six years of its existence, the Atascadero News listed E.G. Lewis as publisher, George B. Lewis (his brother) as advertising manager, J.N. Bissell, editor and L.W. Beckwith, news editor. George Lewis was also manager of printing operations over at The Printery. The Atascadero News was housed in a building next door and behind The Printery. The newspaper moved to its downtown location at 5660 El Camino Real in 1949, where it remained until 2013.

Early on Marguerite A. Travis was hired by Mr. Lewis to write “personal items.” Thus began a career that lasted 30 years. In 1922 she was named city editor by Mr. Lewis. She remained with the newspaper until the 1940s, retiring because of failing eyesight. L.D. Beckwith had resigned to begin his own newspaper in Stockton.

So Lewis hired Capt. Harry Wells from the St. Louis Star to head up the editorial staff in Atascadero. Under Wells, the newspaper became a semi-weekly publication which lasted for only six months in 1921. The paper wouldn’t become a twice-a-week periodical again until 1977.

When Wells left in 1923 to start his own newspaper in San Luis Obispo (the Tribune) the Rev. H.J. Loken of the Federated Church stepped in to help write news. Rev. Loken was a newspaper man during the week and a minister on Sunday. He went fulltime into the ministry in 1925, the same year the Colony Holding Corporation was forced into involuntary bankruptcy.

Ted Bishop era 

The newspaper was sold to Ted Bishop in August 1925. A graduate of the University of Washington in Seattle, Washington, Bishop used the newspaper to support the policies of Oscar Willett, the Seattle attorney who had been appointed receiver by the courts. Bishop wrote that the newspaper’s main focus would be to “continue to place Atascadero in the foreground and ... see that creditors realize the most out of their investments.”

Bishop, with assistance from Marguerite Travis, published the newspaper through the Great Depression. The paper dropped from eight pages to six and finally to four in the 1930s.

J. Montgomery Brown era 

The paper was sold in 1935 to L.B. Garrett of Los Angeles, who owned it only for a year and then sold to J. Montgomery Brown, a former Hearst newspaper man from Ft. Worth, Texas.

“Monty” Brown announced that “there’s a new captain at the helm.”

Brown and his family became very involved in their new community. The newspaper picked up on the community tone it had featured in the Lewis era. On the occasion of the newspaper’s 21st birthday, Brown wrote that the real mission of a newspaper is to: “give the local news accurately and fearlessly, but in kindness ... so that the files of the paper shall constitute a helpful history, accurate, yet showing the sunshine rather than the shadow.”

Monte Brown operated the newspaper for the next dozen years, adding such features as political columnist Drew Pearson, a sports column by Grantland Rice, Kathleen Norris writing about women, a humorous column by H.L. Phillips and “The Nation at War”, a column by Hugh Johnson. During World War II, Brown carried letters on the front page written by local men in the service telling of their adventures.

Porter era 

In September 1947, the Browns sold the family newspaper to Mr. and Mrs. Vernon Tegland who came to Atascadero from Richmond, California. Tegland previously published The Fallbrook enterprise and The Press at White Bear Lake, Minnesota.

The Teglands owned the paper for only a year when they sold out to two Nebraska newspaper men, George Porter and Parke Keays in 1949. Both men had worked together on the Custer County Chief in Broken Bow, Nebraska. In Atascadero, Porter served as editor while Keays was advertising manager. The partnership was the longest tenure of all other publishers, nearly 30 years. Keays retired in 1972, selling his interest in the paper to George Porter’s three sons, Jim, Jud and Jack. The senior Porter resigned as editor/publisher in 1978.

Lon Allan, who joined the newspaper in 1972 as news editor, became editor in 1978 and held the job until his retirement 32 years later, in March 2004, the longest tenure of any editor at The Atascadero News.

The three Porter brothers divided up the tasks of publishing a weekly newspaper as follows: Jud Porter was the business manager and in charge of classified advertising, Jim Porter was advertising manager and Jack Porter was production manager. Other family members worked with The Atascadero News over the years that it was independently owned by them.

The Atascadero News was purchased by News Media Corporation in the winter of 2002, and owned the newspaper through the era of the smartphone, online news, Facebook, and rise of digital and social media, during which the United States suffered a great decline of newspapers.

Mattson era 

In September 2019, News Media Corporation sold ownership of The Atascadero News, along with the Paso Robles Press, Morro Bay Life, Avila Beach Life, Equine Enthusiast, and Vino Magazine to 13 Stars Media, owned by Hayley Mattson. At the time, 13 Stars Media published two monthly magazines — Paso Robles Magazine, Atascadero News Magazine — and a quarterly magazine, Central Coast TRVLR.

The headquarters moved back downtown Atascadero, to 5860 El Camino Real above the former Atascadero Market, a few doors down from the 5660 El Camino Real location where The Atascadero News spent more than 60 years (1949–2013).

References

External links
 

Atascadero, California
Weekly newspapers published in California
Mass media in San Luis Obispo County, California